Castlevania: Symphony of the Night is an action role-playing game developed and published by Konami for the PlayStation. It was directed and produced by Toru Hagihara, with Koji Igarashi acting as assistant director. It is a direct sequel to Castlevania: Rondo of Blood, taking place four years later. It features Dracula's dhampir son Alucard (returning from Castlevania III: Dracula's Curse) as the protagonist, rising from his slumber to explore Dracula's castle which resurfaced after Richter Belmont vanished. Its design marks a break from previous entries in the series, re-introducing the exploration, nonlinear level design, and role-playing elements first experimented with in Castlevania II: Simon's Quest.

Symphony of the Night initially sold poorly. However, it gradually gained sales through word-of-mouth and became a sleeper hit, developing a cult following and selling over 700,000 units in the United States and Japan. The game garnered widespread acclaim, often cited by critics as one of the best video games of all time, praising its gameplay innovations, atmosphere, visuals and soundtrack. It is also considered a pioneer of the Metroidvania genre, inspiring numerous exploration-based action-adventure games. Symphony of the Night would have a lasting impact on the Castlevania series, with numerous subsequent mainline entries adopting its gameplay model.

Gameplay

Symphony of the Night uses 2-dimensional side-scrolling gameplay. The objective is exploring Dracula's castle to defeat an entity named Shaft who is controlling Richter Belmont, the self-proclaimed lord of the castle and hero of the events which took place in Castlevania: Rondo of Blood. Shaft can only be seen with a particular item obtained during gameplay. Once he is defeated, the second portion of the game is revealed, an upside-down version of the first castle, with new enemies and bosses. Alucard has to find five specific bosses to collect five pieces of Dracula (in reference to Castlevania II: Simon's Quest), eventually leading to the final battle with a newly awakened Dracula.

The game is non-linear, but most of the castle is inaccessible until various items and abilities are collected, including shapeshifting into a bat, wolf, or mist. As the player uncovers more of the castle, a map is updated to show progress.

While player characters in previous Castlevania games typically used a whip, the player can find and use a wide variety of weapons. The game includes an inventory and other role-playing game elements.

Castlevania: Symphony of the Night incorporates elements found in role-playing video games. Alucard's hit points determine the maximum amount of damage he can withstand before dying, while his magic points decide how frequently a magical attack may be cast. Alucard can also collect hearts dropped from candles and enemies to use sub-weapons like in previous games. Alucard has four other attributes: strength, the power of his physical attack; constitution, his resilience to damage inflicted by the monsters; intelligence, the power of magical attacks and sub-weapons; and luck, the frequency that items are dropped by enemies as well as the chance to score a critical hit.

Defeating monsters provides Alucard with experience points, and he will level up after reaching a predetermined amount, increasing his attributes in the process. In addition to level-ups, Alucard can also find Life Vessels and Heart Vessels scattered around the castle, which permanently increase Alucard's maximum hit points and hearts respectively. Alucard may cast eight different spells, which requires the player to input directional combinations and will use up varying amounts of his magic points. During the course of the game, Alucard can acquire the ability to summon familiars, which function as complementary entities, aiding him in battle and exploration. 

Alternative modes of gameplay can be unlocked after completion of the game. By inputting Richter Belmont's name as the username, the player can play as Richter, who uses a whip as his main weapon and various sub-weapons. In the Sega Saturn version, the port included in the PlayStation Portable game Castlevania: The Dracula X Chronicles, and in the PlayStation 4 port, Castlevania Requiem, Maria Renard is playable.

Plot

Castlevania: Symphony of the Night begins during the ending of the previous game in the series, Castlevania: Rondo of Blood, where Richter Belmont confronts and defeats Count Dracula. Four years later, in 1796, Richter goes missing and Dracula's castle reappears. Alucard arrives at the castle to destroy it, meeting Maria Renard, who once fought alongside Richter and is searching for him. Alucard meets Richter, who claims to be the new lord of the castle. Convinced that Richter is under somebody else's control, Maria urges Alucard not to hurt him and gives him the Holy Glasses, which allows him to see past illusions. In the castle's keep, Alucard confronts Richter and learns that he plans to resurrect Dracula, so the two can fight for an eternity. During a fight, Alucard breaks the spell controlling Richter, and Dracula's servant Shaft appears and tells them that Dracula will still be resurrected soon.

Alucard leaves Richter and Maria to confront Shaft, venturing into an upside-down duplicate of the castle to seek him out. Shaft reveals he planned to end the threat of the Belmont clan by controlling one of them and forcing the clan to fight one another. After defeating Shaft, Alucard faces his father, who vows to bring an end to humankind because Alucard's mother Lisa was executed as a witch. Alucard refuses to join his father in his revenge, and he defeats him. Alucard tells Dracula that he has been thwarted many times because he lost the ability to love after Lisa's death, and that Lisa's final words were of eternal love for him and a plea not to hate or at least harm humanity. Before Dracula dies, he asks for Lisa's forgiveness and bids his son farewell.

After escaping the collapsing castle, Alucard rejoins Maria and Richter. Maria is relieved that he escaped, while Richter blames himself as the reason for Alucard's fight with his father. Alucard tells Richter, "the only thing necessary for the triumph of evil is for good men to do nothing", (a quote attributed to Edmund Burke) and resolves to disappear from the world because of his cursed bloodline. Depending on how much of the castle the player has explored, Maria either chases Alucard in the hope of changing his mind, or resigns herself to Alucard's fate and leaves with Richter.

Development
In 1994, development began on a Castlevania game for the 32X, retroactively known under the title Castlevania: The Bloodletting. A playable prototype was created, but Konami decided to refocus its efforts on the PlayStation, and the game was cancelled as a result. Changes were made to these initial ideas, and the project became Symphony of the Night.

The game was directed and produced by Toru Hagihara, who had directed the previous entry, Rondo of Blood. Igarashi had creative influence and was involved with the story-writing and programming. Part way through production, Hagihara was promoted to head of the division and asked Igarashi to finish the game as the assistant director. From the outset, the game was intended to represent a new direction for the franchise. According to Igarashi, Castlevania: Symphony of the Night began development as "something of a side story for the series, we were able to break  of Castlevania conventions and introduce a lot of new elements that we still use today". Their primary motivation for the abrupt design change was the sight of dozens of Castlevania games in bargain bins of Japanese video game stores; linear Castlevania games offered limited replay value after completion. A noted fan of 2D games, Igarashi was instrumental in refining the game's control scheme.

Igarashi felt that regular action games were too short, and he wanted to create a game that "could be enjoyed for a long time". Consequently, the development team abandoned the traditional stage-by-stage progression of the previous Castlevania games in favor of an open castle that the player could freely explore. Igarashi looked to Nintendo's The Legend of Zelda series, which involved much exploration and backtracking to extend the amount of gameplay. Igarashi was able to use the critical reaction from Castlevania II: Simon's Quest, which was more focused on exploration than action, to pitch Symphony of the Night to Konami. The development team used inspiration from The Legend of Zelda to make most of the castle areas initially inaccessible to the player. The player would gradually obtain items and abilities that progressively opened up the castle. Their idea was to reward exploration while retaining the hack-and-slash action of the previous games.

Role-playing mechanics were added because Igarashi felt the earlier Castlevania games were too challenging for average players. To change that, the team implemented a leveling-up system with experience points, which rewarded players with better attack and defense statistics as they beat enemies. This system, combined with a variety of items, armors, weapons and spells, allowed the exploration to become less difficult for unskilled players.

Symphony of the Night marked the debut of artist Ayami Kojima in the video game industry. She worked on the game as a character designer, conceptualizing the game's main and supporting cast. Her designs for the game are heavily influenced by bishōnen-style art. The game is presented using 2D visuals, mainly sprites animated over scrolling backgrounds. The PlayStation had no hardware for scrolling, which lead to the developers using the same methods for displaying character sprites to display the backgrounds. Occasionally, the 3D capabilities of the PlayStation are utilized. The game contains opening and ending cinematics, which were created by another group at Konami. Igarashi and the development team were disappointed in the quality of the cinematics, which featured flat models lacking textures.

Audio
The music used in Castlevania: Symphony of the Night was composed by Michiru Yamane. The soundtrack contains elements from multiple musical genres, including classical, techno, gothic rock, new-age, jazz, and subgenres of metal, specifically elements of thrash metal. "I Am the Wind", a vocal ending theme written by Rika Muranaka and Tony Haynes, and performed by Cynthia Harrell, is played during the credits.

Versions and re-releases

PlayStation and Saturn 
Castlevania: Symphony of the Night was released in Japan on March 20, 1997, in North America on October 2, 1997, and in Europe in November 1997. The Japanese release was packaged with an art book containing a small manga based on the game and a soundtrack compiled from most of the previous Castlevania games.

The North American and European version's localization was handled by Jeremy Blaustein, although he was not present for the voice recording. Blaustein added the lines "What is a man? A miserable little pile of secrets", which were taken from the novel Man's Fate by André Malraux. Other changes made in localization included AI improvements, the addition of a sound test, and the correction of a game-crashing bug found in the Japanese release. The game was low-balled as a prospect for release in the United States, given relatively little advertising, received limited funding for its North American production, and was initially not a major financial success. The game was re-released in Japan on the "PlayStation the Best" label on March 19, 1998, and in North America on "Greatest Hits" in 1998.

In 1998, a port of Castlevania: Symphony of the Night was released in Japan for the Sega Saturn. In this version, Maria Renard is both a fully playable character as well as a boss fight, and Richter is available to play at the start of the game. When playing the game as Alucard, a "third hand" is available, but only for stat-altering items like food and potions and not weaponry. Alucard can use exclusive items, such as the Godspeed Boots, which grant him the ability to run like Richter. New areas, the Cursed Prison and the Underground Garden, which include new bosses, can be visited. The port also contains remixes of songs from previous Castlevania games. However, loading is more frequent and takes longer in the Saturn version than in other versions. Because the Saturn has limited hardware transparency support, transparency effects such as the mists and the waterfall were replaced with dithering effects, though partial translucency does exist in a few areas such as with Saturn exclusive enemies and one of the final boss fights. Rather than taking advantage of the Saturn's increased resolution, the graphics were stretched to fill the screen, causing some sprites to be distorted. The overall quality of the Saturn port's video is said, according to Igarashi, to be lower than the PlayStation version because it is a simple port handled by another team and was not programmed to take advantage of the Saturn's 2D capabilities. Igarashi overall expressed disappointment with the Saturn version.

Re-releases 
A prototype port for the Game.com was developed but never commercially released.

In 2006, Konami announced that the PlayStation version of the game would be ported to the Xbox 360, distributed via Xbox Live Arcade. The game was ported by Backbone Entertainment. It was the first Xbox Live Arcade title to exceed the 50 MB file size restriction for games on the service at the time. Xbox Live Arcade group manager Greg Canessa stated that an exception was made for Symphony of the Night to "ensure that the gameplay experience is the best it can be". This version was released on March 21, 2007. As with most Xbox Live Arcade games, Castlevania: Symphony of the Night features leaderboards that track players' progress through the castle and features 12 achievements worth 200 points. To save space, all full motion video sequences were removed from the North American and European versions of the game. They have since been returned to the Japanese version, which is approximately 25 megabytes larger. While the unpatched version on Xbox Live Arcade still featured "I Am the Wind" as the game's closing music, a later patch replaced it with "Admiration Towards the Clan", the closing song in Castlevania: Lament of Innocence due to licensing reasons. This patch also fixed a distorted background image in one ending. In 2009, Konami released Castlevania: Symphony of the Night alongside Super Contra and Frogger on the Konami Classics Vol. 1 compilation for Xbox 360.

Symphony of the Night was re-released as a "PSone Classics" title on the PlayStation Network store on July 19, 2007, in North America, on December 16, 2010, in Japan, and on December 12, 2012, in Europe for use with the PlayStation 3, the PlayStation Portable, and the PlayStation Vita.

A port of Symphony of the Night was included as unlockable bonus content in Castlevania: The Dracula X Chronicles for the PlayStation Portable, which was released in North America on October 23, 2007, in Japan on November 8, 2007, and in Europe on February 18, 2008. Except for the Japanese release, the English translation features a new script and newly recorded voice acting, with the option to use the original Japanese voices. The PSP release is a port of the PlayStation version, but contains some additions and changes. Maria Renard is a playable character and a boss in this version, sporting a new moveset modeled after her abilities in Rondo of Blood. Like the Xbox 360 version, "I Am the Wind" was replaced with "Mournful Serenade", a new piece composed by Michiru Yamane, as the closing theme. An English-recorded version of the song "Nocturne" was added along with several familiars, both of which had been removed in previous international releases of the game. The Dracula X Chronicles versions of Symphony of the Night and Rondo of Blood were re-released for the PlayStation 4 on October 26, 2018 as part of the Castlevania Requiem compilation. Android and iOS ports of the game were released on March 4, 2020, based on the Dracula X Chronicles version.

In 2010, Castlevania Puzzle: Encore of the Night, a puzzle game based on Symphony of the Night, was released for iOS.

Reception

Castlevania: Symphony of the Night received wide critical acclaim at the time of its release. Critics lauded the massive, free-to-explore game world with its numerous secrets to uncover, and praised the game for integrating role-playing elements without compromising the series' basic gameplay. Multiple critics also made mention of the ingeniously designed enemies and the story's many plot twists. GameSpot hailed it as "easily one of the best games ever released and a true testament to the fact that 2D gaming is not dead by any stretch of the imagination." Computer and Video Games commented, "This may be old-skool style, but it feels like the freshest thing of the year." Next Generation stated that "Symphony of the Night has classic written all over it" and called it "spectacular" for a 2D side-scrolling platformer in the age of 32- and 64-bit games. GamePro gave it a perfect 5.0 out of 5 in all four categories (graphics, sound, control, and fun factor), calling it "one of the best games of the year."

Despite the popular consensus of the time that 2D had become outmoded, critics also highly praised the game's graphics for their smooth animation, impressive effects, and evocation of atmosphere. John Ricciardi of Electronic Gaming Monthly wrote that "everything is animated with an amazing attention to detail, and the special effects used throughout provide an atmosphere that just begs to be experienced." However, there were a few detractors of the use of 2D. Entertainment Weekly said that the visuals were dated and flat, when compared to Nightmare Creatures which featured 3D environments, while IGN commented, "The graphics are initially similar-looking to SNES and Genesis incarnations of the game, the character animation isn't particularly smooth and 3D is resigned to limited background effects and the odd special effect." A few criticized the voice acting, though GameSpot instead praised it. The music was met with almost unanimous approval, IGN describing it as "sometimes daunting, sometimes rousing and always doing what music should—enhancing the action."

In Electronic Gaming Monthlys Editors' Choice Awards, Castlevania: Symphony of the Night was awarded "PlayStation Game of the Year" and "Side-Scrolling Game of the Year", and was a runner-up for "Best Music" (behind PaRappa the Rapper) and "Game of the Year" (behind GoldenEye 007). It also was named "Best Sequel" in their annual Buyer's Guide. It was named "Game of the Year" by PSM in its list of the top ten games of 1997.

Castlevania: Symphony of the Night received a nomination for "Console Adventure Game of the Year" at the inaugural AIAS Interactive Achievement Awards (now known as the D.I.C.E. Awards).

The game has developed a large cult following and copies of the original PlayStation version are considered collector's items. It demonstrated the continued popularity of 2D games during the fifth generation of video game consoles in the 32-bit era, which saw rapid advancements in 3D gaming.

The game has continued to receive critical acclaim, and it has appeared on several other "greatest game" lists. The same year it was released, it was ranked the 12th best console video game of all time by Electronic Gaming Monthly, which said it "is not only the best 2-D game on the PlayStation, it's one of the best, period." It appeared on GameSpots "The Greatest Games of All Time" list. It was placed 16th on IGN's "Top 100 Games of All Time" and 24th in Game Informers "Top 200 Video Games Ever", down six places from its 2001 ranking. GameZone ranked it the best Castlevania title ever made. GamePro listed the discovery of the inverted castle as the 26th-greatest moment in gaming. GamesRadar named Castlevania: Symphony of the Night the second-best PlayStation game of all time, behind Metal Gear Solid. It was ranked 4th place on EGM's list of 100 greatest games of all time, and was the highest PS1 game on the list. Edge ranked the game No. 35 on its list of "The 100 Best Games To Play Today", stating "When you get to that moment when the castle turns on its head, you see that it's a work of genius".

The gameplay of Castlevania: Symphony of the Night and its 2D successors is often compared in the gaming press with the popular series Metroid, with both Castlevania: Symphony of the Night and Super Metroid seen as pioneers in the genre, leading to the coinage of the term "Metroidvania" (a portmanteau of Metroid and Castlevania), used to describe video games that share some of their elements.

Sales
Initially, the game's commercial performance was mediocre, particularly in the United States where it was meagerly publicized, but thanks to praise by critics, it gained sales through word-of-mouth and became a hit. The PlayStation and Saturn versions sold 225,862 units in Japan, while the PlayStation version sold 477,304 units in the United States, for a total of  units sold in the United States and Japan.

Notes

References

External links

 

1990s horror video games
1997 video games
Action role-playing video games
Android (operating system) games
Symphony of the Night
Cancelled Game.com games
Fiction set in 1797
IOS games
Open-world video games
Patricide in fiction
PlayStation (console) games
PlayStation 4 games
PlayStation Portable games
Sega Saturn games
Side-scrolling platform games
Side-scrolling role-playing video games
Single-player video games
Tiger Electronics handheld games
Video games about shapeshifting
Video games developed in Japan
Video games scored by Michiru Yamane
Video games set in the 18th century
Video games with alternate endings
Xbox 360 Live Arcade games